Confidencias is the fourteenth studio album and the second covers album recorded by the Mexican pop singer Alejandro Fernández. It was released internationally on 27 August 2013.

Track listing
 Standard edition

 Deluxe edition

Charts

Weekly charts

Year-end charts

Certifications

References

2013 albums
Alejandro Fernández albums
albums produced by Phil Ramone
Universal Music Latino albums